Queen's Park is an urban park in Downtown Toronto, Ontario, Canada. Opened in 1860 by Edward, Prince of Wales, it was named in honour of Queen Victoria. The park is the site of the Ontario Legislative Building, which houses the Legislative Assembly of Ontario. The phrase "Queen's Park" is regularly used as a metonym for the Government of Ontario or the Legislative Assembly of Ontario.

The park is nearly an enclave of the University of Toronto, which occupies most of the surrounding lands. In 1859, the land was leased by the University of Toronto to the City of Toronto government for a 999-year term. In 1880, a "portion of the Queen's Park [was] selected [and given to] the Government of Ontario, as a site for the erection of new Legislative and Departmental buildings". The land that is occupied by the Legislative Assembly of Ontario is owned by the Government of Ontario.  The north park is owned by the University of Toronto and leased to the city.  Ministry buildings of the Ontario government occupy other properties to the east of the park, in an area between Wellesley Street and Grosvenor Street.

History
Shortly after King's College (later renamed the University of Toronto) was established in 1827, the institution purchased  from two farming estates north of the Town of York (present-day Toronto), including present day Queen's Park.

 North Half of Park Lot 11 from Mary Elmsley (John Elmsley's estate)
 North half of Park Lot 12 from William Drummer Powell
 North half of Park Lot 13 from D'Arcy Boulton

The cornerstone for one of the college's earliest buildings was laid at the site on 23 April 1842. The building was built on the present site of the east wing of the Ontario Legislative Building, and was completed in 1843; although it remained vacant until 1845. The building was initially planned to be the southeast wing for a larger building, although these additional wings were never built as a result of budget shortfalls. The building was situated within a landscaped park surrounded by tree-lined avenues, and was accessed through two gates to the north and south. While the university occupied the property it  was known as University Park.

In 1853, the Parliament of the Province of Canada expropriated the building for its use; with the University of Toronto relocating classes held in that building to the Third Parliament Buildings of Upper Canada. The Parliament of the Province of Canada was based in Toronto from 1849 to 1853 and again from 1856 to 1858; having relocated several times within the Province of Canada during its existence.

The terms of the lease also outlined that the government had the right to build a legislative building on the property if they so desired.

On 11 September 1860, the property was officially dedicated as Canada's first municipal park by Edward, Prince of Wales (later King Edward VII); and was named Queen's Park, in honour of Queen Victoria. The park was originally planned to be opened the previous Saturday, although heavy rain led the dedication ceremony to be rescheduled to Tuesday. During the ceremony, he also laid a cornerstone for an eventual statue of Queen Victoria at the southern apex of the park. However, financial difficulties and delays would eventually see this spot be occupied by a statue of Sir John A. Macdonald, the first prime minister of Canada. The statue for Victoria would eventually be purchased and placed near the entrance to the legislative building in 1902.

In 1879, the provincial government acted on its option to construct a new legislature on the property and informed the city of its intention to do so. However, construction was delayed by inconclusive design competition, with the design commission finally awarded in 1886 to Richard A. Waite. Ownership of the southern portion of the park was also handed over to the provincial government in 1886. The Ontario Legislative Building was completed in 1892, and hosted its first legislative session on 4 April 1893. After the building's completion, Russian cannons originally placed at the southern tip of the park in 1859 were moved to the legislature's entrance. The Russian cannons were war prizes captured by British forces during the Crimean War, and gifted to the city of Toronto by Queen Victoria 1859.

Although the new legislative building split the park into two sections, local residents continued to congregate there for concerts, memorial services, military parades, and political gatherings. During the late-19th century, the northern portion of Queen's Park also hosted a public speakers' forum on Sunday. During the First World War, the park was used as a gathering point for soldiers of the Canadian Expeditionary Force.

In 1984, Queen's Park hosted two tree planting ceremonies for the eastern white pine, after it was declared the province's official tree that year. The first tree planting ceremony took place on 25 May 1984 by Bob Welch, the deputy premier of Ontario in order to commemorate Arbour Day. The second tree planting ceremony also took place that year at the same location, with Queen Elizabeth II and the then-Duke of Edinburgh planting two eastern white pines on 29 September 1984. A plaque marks the spot of the tree plantings, and the trees that grew from it.

In the early 2000s, Canadian poet Dennis Lee and poet advocate Richard Griffin led a campaign to erect a statue of Al Purdy, another Canadian poet, on the grounds of Queen's Park. The campaign specifically insisted that the statue should be located at Queen's Park, in order to demonstrate the significance of poetry and the arts in Canada's cultural life. The statue was eventually built and unveiled in 2008, making it the first statue at Queen's Park that commemorates an individual that was not a political figure or monarch.

Layout

The shape of Queen's Park is similar to an oval, although the southwestern edge of Queens Park "kinks in" somewhat. The "kink" in the southwestern edge formed the former bank of Taddle Creek, a waterway underground. The oval park is bounded by Queen's Park Crescent East and West. These form part of a major through route consist of University Avenue (south of College Street), Queen's Park Crescent East and West, Queen's Park, and Avenue Road (north of Bloor Street).

Queen's Park Crescent East and West carry northbound and southbound traffic respectively and are linked to make a complete counterclockwise loop around the park. University Avenue, Queen's Park (with no suffix), and Avenue Road have two-way traffic and lie in essentially the same straight line. Wellesley Street bisects Queen's Park Crescent slightly north of the loop's centre.

The portion of the park north of Wellesley Street is maintained by the Toronto Parks, Forestry and Recreation Division and includes a number of benches along paving stones, and picnic tables. The section follows the traditional British design, dominated by large trees that provide extensive cover during summer. The pathways radiate outwards from an equestrian statue of Edward VII, which stands on a large mound at the centre of the northern section. The main north-south path runs between the equestrian statue and the war memorial for the 48th Highlanders of Canada at the park's northern tip. The north section of Queen's Park is the 'saluting station' for the Province of Ontario. Gun salutes are conducted here to mark special occasions including Victoria Day (fired at 1200 EDT), Canada Day (fired at 1200 EDT), and Remembrance Day (fired at 1102 EST). Other salutes are also conducted here throughout the year as dictated by protocol.

The portion of Queen's Park south of Wellesley Street is maintained by the provincial government and includes the Ontario Legislative Building south of Wellesley Street, the parking lot to the south of the building, and the remaining portions of the park. In contrast to the northern portion of the Queen's Park, minimal landscaping was done to the southern portion of the park. However, the southern portion of the park includes the majority of the monuments and memorials in the park, and the Queen Elizabeth II rose gardens. The first portion of the rose gardens was dedicated in 1977, to mark the silver jubilee of Elizabeth II. An extension to the garden was added in 2003 to mark the Queen's golden jubilee. The southern portion of the park also includes the "White Trillium Garden", a garden that is landscaped with white trilliums, the official floral emblem of the province. There also exists a native species garden, a garden primarily landscaped with vegetation native to the area, including eastern white cedars, hackberries, and some perennial flowers. The southern tip of the park facing University Avenue features the statue of Sir John A. Macdonald, the first prime minister of Canada.

Geography

Queen's Park is situated on top of sandy sediment, having been deposited there when the area was the floor bed for Glacial Lake Iroquois. Initially, the area was covered with eastern white pine, northern red oak, and white oak trees. However, because a number of non-native trees from Europe were planted around the area during the early 19th century, the park presently holds a large variety of trees from Europe, as well as trees native to Toronto. Attempts have been made to restore the park to resemble how it appeared prior to the introduction of non-native species through the planting of additional trees native to the area.

Transit access
Line 1 Yonge-University of the Toronto subway runs below University Avenue, Queen's Park (the park, to one side of the legislature), and Queen's Park (the street), serving the area via its Queen's Park and Museum  stations. Other public transit access is provided by the 13 Avenue Road and 94 Wellesley bus routes, and the 506 Carlton streetcar route.

Memorials and monuments
Queen's Park holds a number of monuments and war memorials to commemorate events and/or individuals. Most of them were erected during the late 19th- to early 20th century, although there are several memorials that were erected in the late-20th and early 21st century. Monuments at the park come in a variety of forms, including a number of full-length statues of persons. Several monuments are also located adjacent to Queen's Park.

The first monument erected at Queen's Park was the Canadian Volunteer Memorial. Unveiled at the park in 1870, it is the second oldest monument in Toronto. Sculpted by Robert Reid, the monument was dedicated to Toronto residents that fought during the Battle of Ridgeway.

A second war memorial erected at Queen's Park was in 1895, the North-West Rebellion Monument. The monument commemorated members of the Canadian Militia and the North-West Mounted Police that fought during the conflict. The statue was cast in bronze and is placed atop a  white granite base. Iron cannonballs are placed on the corners of the plinth, with the names of battles and war dead listed on the memorial. The memorial was sculpted by Walter Seymour Allward, and was the first publicly commissioned work he had completed. Another plaque was later added to the back of the memorial, commemorating a reunion of the conflict's veterans at the site in 1935.

Near the northern apex of Queen's Park is the 48th Highlanders Regimental Memorial, erected in 1923. The north side of the monument features an inscription that reads "swords of sacrifice" on the monument's bas-relief, with a list of engagements that the regiment was involved in during the Second Boer War listed below the inscription. Regimental battle honours from the First World War are also listed on the monument's east and west face; whereas the unit's battle honours from the Second World War are inscribed on the monument's south face.

In 1940, the Mackenzie monument was unveiled, commemorating William Lyon Mackenzie, as well as the establishment of responsible government in the Province of Canada. The monument and bust were sculpted by Walter Seymour Allward.

In 1967, the government of Ontario unveiled the Post One Monument, commemorating the Canadian Centennial. The monument is a stainless-steel plate, mounted on a flat concrete slab. A  bronze map of the country is affixed to the stainless steel plate. Similar memorials are also situated in the capitals of other Canadian provinces, with each of these monuments also having inscribed the distance from the memorials to the various provincial capitals. Surveyor tools such as survey markers were also sculpted onto the plate. In addition to commemorating the centennial the monument also holds a time capsule scheduled to be opened in 2067.

The Ontario Veterans’ Memorial was unveiled on 17 September 2006 and commemorates Ontarians that participated in a military campaign with the Canadian military from Canadian Confederation to the present. The monument is a  granite wall with 44 images depicting Canada's military history etched into the 24 grey granite panels. Conflicts depicted in these images includes the Fenian raids, North-West Rebellion, Second Boer War, First World War, Second World War, Korean War, and various peacekeeping and support operations during the Cold War, and war in Afghanistan. The monument is topped-off by a  black granite. A plaque situated next to the monument's seating area provides a brief recount of Ontario's military history, from the War of 1812 to the war in Afghanistan. The memorial was designed by Allan Harding Mackay and landscaping firm Phillips Farevaag Smallenberg; Ontarian-born historian Jack Granatstein wrote the historical text and choose the images, while Ontarian-born poet Jane Urquhart wrote the monumental inscription found on the monument.

Near the southern tip of the park on the pathway towards the legislative building, there also exist two plaques affixed to boulders. The first boulder was installed in 1935, commemorating the silver jubilee of King George V; whereas the second boulder serves as a memorial for the victims of the Air India Flight 182 bombing in 1985. Another large boulder with a plaque affixed to it is situated northeast of the Mackenzie monument, and commemorates Canadian volunteers of the Mackenzie–Papineau Battalion. The battalion, which partly owes its namesake to William Lyon Mackenzie, fought during the Spanish Civil War as a part of the XV International Brigade.

Statues of individuals
In addition to memorials, a number of full-body statues that commemorate individuals are also situated at Queen's Park. The majority of the statues are mounted on plinths. Most of the statues situated in the southern portion of the park face away from the legislative building, towards the south.

Memorials adjacent to the park

Several monuments are built adjacent to Queen's Park, separated by roadways that surround the oval-shaped park. The Canadian Volunteers Memorial is presently located west of Queen's Park Crescent West. The monument was originally situated within the park when it was unveiled, although the monument was later severed from the park with the construction of Queen's Park Crescent. Atop that is an ornamental shaft with niches that have two life-sized marble figures representing members of the Canadian Militia. On top of the ornamental shaft is a marble statue of Britannia with a plumed helmet, a staff in one hand and laurel leaves in the other. Although the surface of the monument was treated in 2005, much of the detailing on the monument has since faded.

Three monuments have been commissioned by the government of Ontario and have been installed in locations adjacent to the southern portion of Queen's Park. In 2000, the Ontario Police Memorial was dedicated to police officers who lost their lives while serving the community. Designed by Siggy Puchta, the memorial depicts two figures atop the granite plinth, a male police officer in duty dress from the 1950s, and a female police officer in duty dress dating from the 2000s. The monument includes a list of names in random order of each police officer from Ontario that died while serving the public. As of 2008, 234 names were added to the wall.  Constable John Fisk is the earliest name recorded on the memorial having drowned in Lake Ontario in 1804, after the vessel he was using to transport a prisoner sank during a storm.

A similar memorial known as the Ontario Firefighter Memorial was also unveiled in 2005, honouring firefighters who died while serving the public. The memorial portrays a firefighter in the midst of rescuing a child.  The memorial was also designed by Puchta, and included a red plinth shaped like a Maltese Cross, the international symbol for firefighting; and a list of firefighters who died on duty.

The Notre Place monument is a monument that commemorates the Franco-Ontarian community as well as the contributions the francophone community made to Ontario. The monument was first proposed in 2015. Work on the monument began on 25 September 2017, on Franco-Ontarian day, and was unveiled on the same day the following year. The stainless steel columns were designed to commemorate Franco-Ontarian contributions in the province's forestry industry, while the surrounding public square was intended to be used as a gathering space. The name of the monument, Notre Place, is a reference to song from Paul Demers and François Dubé. The name of the monument, and the Franco-Ontarian flag is also present on the stoned wall bench that surrounds most of the square. Designed by the architectural firm Brooke McIlroy, the cost to construct the monument was approximate C$900,000.

See also
Monarchy in Ontario
Parliament Hill

Notes

References

Further reading

External links

 Explore Queen's Park - Legislative Assembly of Ontario
 Queen's Park - City of Toronto

Monuments and memorials in Toronto
Parks in Toronto
Monuments and memorials to Queen Victoria